Jim Johansen (born 6 February 1987 in Harstad) is a Norwegian football winger who most recently played for Notodden.

Career

Club career

Harstad
After being considered as a big talent for several seasons in Harstad, and contributing with plenty of goals, he got his big breakthrough in 2009. Even though it was in the third division in Norway, he managed to score 52 goals in one season, and some of the bigger clubs in Norway was watching him.

Strømsgodset
On 6 November 2009, Jim Johansen signed a contract with the Norwegian club Strømsgodset, after impressing the club on his try-out.

Career statistics

References

External links
Profile at Godset.no

1987 births
Living people
Norwegian footballers
Harstad IL players
Strømsgodset Toppfotball players
FK Bodø/Glimt players
Bryne FK players
Sogndal Fotball players
Eliteserien players
People from Harstad
Association football midfielders
Sportspeople from Troms og Finnmark